Anders Waagan (born 18 February 2000) is a Norwegian footballer who plays as a forward for Spjelkavik IL. He has featured 12 times for the Norway national under-17 football team, scoring 1 goal, and made his debut in Eliteserien at the age of 17 in 2017.

References 

2000 births
Living people
Sportspeople from Ålesund
People from Haram, Norway
Norwegian footballers
Aalesunds FK players
Spjelkavik IL players
Eliteserien players
Norwegian First Division players
Norway youth international footballers
Association football forwards